"Migrate" is a song by American singer and songwriter Mariah Carey from her eleventh studio album, E=MC² (2008). It was written and produced by Carey and Danja, with additional songwriting from The Clutch and the track's featured artist, T-Pain. An up-tempo hip hop club track, it is about Carey's movement on a girls' night out, ranging from the club, the bar, the VIP lounge, the after party and the hotel. Critical response was mixed, with many critics disapproving of Carey's decision to use Auto-Tune on her vocals. "Migrate" peaked at number ninety-two on the United States' Billboard Hot 100 chart, ninety-five on the Hot R&B/Hip-Hop Songs chart and sixty-nine on the Pop 100 chart. Carey and T-Pain performed the song on Saturday Night Live.

Background and composition
"Migrate" was written and produced by Mariah Carey and Danja, with additional songwriting from The Clutch and the tracks featured artist, T-Pain, for Carey's eleventh studio album, E=MC² (2008). Carey produced the track for Maroon Entertainment and by Danja on behalf of Dan Jahandz Productions. Copyright is held by Rye Songs which is administered by Songs of Universal (BMI)/Dan Jahandz Musik (SESAC), administered by W.B.M. Music Corp. (SESAC)/Universal-Polygram International Tunes/Jahqae Joints (SESAC)/Nabbypub Music - Universal Songs - Z Songs (BMI). The song was recorded  by Brian Garten at Roc the Mic Studios in New York and at Honeysouth Studios and Circle House Studios, both in Miami. Additional recording was carried out by James "Scrappy" Stassen. It was mixed by Marcella "Ms. Lago" Araica at The Hit Factory in Miami; she was assisted by Miguel Bustamante. Carey and MaryAnn Tatum performed backgrounds. T-Pain appears courtesy of Jive Records.

"Migrate" is an up-tempo hip hop club track. Lyrically, it is about the freedom and independence of a girls' night out. It documents Carey's whereabouts and where she migrates from and to: "from the car to the club to the bar to the VIP lounge to the after-party to the hotel" and contains a reference to Patrón, a brand of Mexican tequila. As the song is about movement from one place to another, T-Pain tells her to "bounce" in response. Carey displays a sense of "confident, social forwardness" on "Migrate". Nick Levine of Digital Spy thought that Carey sounded her "most diva-like" on the song, with the references to champagne being "compliments of the club" while the DJ plays her "jam". Melodically, Carey delivers the track over a "repeating" chorus backed by a "descending echo-synth". It contains a reduced number of notes in order to further accentuate the hook. While Carey employs a "sassy" tone of voice, both her and T-Pain's vocals are processed with Auto-Tune. Stephen Thomas Erlewine of AllMusic thought that the use of Auto-Tune on Carey's vocals served a "dual purpose", and explained that while it "camouflages her slightly diminishing range" it also made her sound "modern". Ben Ratliff of The New York Times felt that T-Pain sounded more interesting than Carey despite the use of Auto-Tune.

Critical reception

Sarah Rodman of The Boston Globe described "Migrate" as "a frivolous, funky, self-referential jam". The New York Sun Jayanthi Daniels thought the track sounded like something that R. Kelly would release, and continued to write that Carey "is no longer looking for a 'Dreamlover' to come and rescue her, as she did in 1993: In 'Migrate,' she's already rescued, and enjoying the after-party". He also said that the song is "much stronger" than E=MC²s lead single, "Touch My Body". Writing for The Wichita Eagle, Mary Moore's review on the song was positive, calling it as "an irresistible hip-hop groove that works". The Guardians Alex Macpherson labelled the track as "sinister". Evan Sawdey of PopMatters was critical of "Migrate", and called it "grating" and "a tepid and uninvolving attempt at a club anthem". He continued to write that the song is void of a proper melodic structure and expressed disapproval of its use of processed vocal filters. Sawdey concluded by writing that despite the added production from Danja and guest vocals by T-Pain, "it serves as a painfully dull opener". Similarly, J. Freedom du Lac felt that the Auto-Tune "needlessly distorts [Carey's] greatest gift". Jim Farber of the Daily News felt that the use of processed vocals was more appropriate for "stars" who cannot sing.

Live performances 
Carey was announced as a musical guest on an episode of Saturday Night Live, her fourth appearance during her career. Hosted by Jonah Hill, Carey substituted for Janet Jackson, who was scheduled to perform but had caught the flu and was unable sing. Carey performed "Migrate", accompanied on stage by T-Pain, and "Touch My Body".

Charts

References

Mariah Carey songs
Songs written by Mariah Carey
Songs written by Balewa Muhammad
Songs written by T-Pain
Songs written by Danja (record producer)
2008 songs
Songs written by Candice Nelson (songwriter)
Songs written by Ezekiel Lewis
Songs written by Patrick "J. Que" Smith
Songs written by Keri Hilson